Ekaterina Andreevna Bychkova (born 5 June 1985) is a former tennis player from Russia.

In her career, Bychkova won ten singles and five doubles titles on the ITF Women's Circuit. On 20 February 2006, she reached her best singles ranking of world No. 66. On 29 January 2007, she peaked at No. 106 in the doubles rankings. Bychkova defeated defending champion Svetlana Kuznetsova in the first round of the 2005 US Open.

She was coached by her mother, Liudmila Bychkova. Her father's name is Andrey Bychkov. Introduced to tennis by her mother, she began playing at the Spartak and Chajka tennis clubs. Currently coaches players and commentates with Eurosport, 

She co-hosted, with Irish-born Russia-based sportsperson, sports journalist and administrator Alan Moore, on Capital Sports from 2017-18. She also reported for The Bookmaker Ratings.
Bychkova returned to the circuit in February 2021, competing on the ITF Women's World Tour until October 2021.

ITF Circuit finals

Singles: 17 (10 titles, 7 runner-ups)

Doubles: 15 (5 titles, 10 runner-ups)

References

External links

 
 
 

1985 births
Living people
Tennis players from Moscow
Russian female tennis players
Russian sports journalists